Marilyn Sachs (December 18, 1927 – December 28, 2016) was an American author of award-winning children's books.

Early life and education
Sachs was born in New York City and grew up in the Bronx. She earned a bachelor's degree from Hunter College and a master's in library science from Columbia University. Sachs worked as a children's librarian at the Brooklyn Public Library while working toward her graduate degree.

Career
Sachs began focusing on her writing during a leave of absence from her library job in 1954. Unable to sell her first novel, Amy Moves In, she set it aside and moved with her husband and children to San Francisco, California in 1961, taking a job at the Main Library.

Sachs found a publisher for her book in 1964. By 1968, she had made enough money from her first four published novels to quit her librarian job and become a full-time writer. Sachs wrote 40 books in total, between 1964 and 2006.

Personal life
While living in New York, Sachs was active in the political organization American Youth for Democracy, which is where she met her future husband, sculptor Morris Sachs. Sachs continued her activism later in life, fighting for public school integration and demonstrating against the Vietnam War. In 1991, she co-edited The Big Book for Peace; the proceeds were donated to peace organizations.

Death
Sachs died in San Francisco on December 28, 2016, at the age of 89.

Selected works

Matt's Mitt. Doubleday. 1975. .
Fleet-Footed Florence (sequel to Matt's Mitt). Doubleday. 1981. .

Awards and recognition
 1968 – Veronica Ganz – American Library Association Notable Book
 1972 – The Bears' House – National Book Award finalist
 1973 – A Pocket Full of Seeds – New York Times Outstanding Book of the Year
 1991 – The Big Book for Peace (co-editor) – Jane Addams Children's Book Award
 American Jewish Library Award

References

External links 
 Interview with Marilyn Sachs at the Children's Literature Research Collection at the University of Minnesota, All About Kids! TV Series #124 (1992)

1927 births
2016 deaths
American children's writers
Hunter College alumni
Columbia University School of Library Service alumni
Novelists from New York (state)
Writers from San Francisco
Jewish American novelists
20th-century American novelists
21st-century American novelists
American women children's writers
20th-century American women writers
21st-century American women writers
21st-century American Jews